Ibrahima Savane (born 10 September 1993) is a Guinean professional footballer who plays as a left-back for French club Sedan.

Early life
Savane was born in Conakry, Guinea, and moved to Ivry-sur-Seine, France, at the age of one. He briefly returned to Guinea from age 11 to 13. He began his footballing career as a forward, but developed successfully as a left-back.

Club career
Savane played amateur football with Olympique Noisy-le-Sec and UJA Maccabi Paris Métropole before signing for Béziers in the summer of 2016.

He made his Ligue 2 debut for Béziers in a 2–0 win over AS Nancy on 27 July 2018.

On 16 July 2019, Savane joined Scottish Premiership side Livingston on a two-year deal on a free transfer from Béziers. He left Scotland in November, having been unable to settle in the country.

In January 2020, he trialled with 3. Liga side SG Sonnenhof Großaspach, and Laval, before signing for Avranches on 31 January 2020.

In June 2020 he moved to fellow Championnat National side SO Cholet, signing a one-year contract with an option for an extra year should the club achieve promotion.

After not playing in the first half of the 2021–22 season, on 2 December 2021 he signed with Sedan, also in Championnat National.

References

External links

Foot-National Profile

1993 births
Living people
Sportspeople from Conakry
Association football fullbacks
Guinean footballers
French footballers
Guinean emigrants to France
Olympique Noisy-le-Sec players
UJA Maccabi Paris Métropole players
AS Béziers (2007) players
Ligue 2 players
Livingston F.C. players
US Avranches players
SO Cholet players
CS Sedan Ardennes players
Championnat National players
Championnat National 3 players
Scottish Professional Football League players
Expatriate footballers in Scotland
People from Ivry-sur-Seine
Footballers from Val-de-Marne